Africa Squeaks is a 1940 Warner Bros. Looney Tunes cartoon directed by Bob Clampett. The short was released on January 27, 1940, and stars Porky Pig.

The cartoon is a parody of the movie Stanley and Livingstone starring Spencer Tracy and Cedric Hardwicke. The title parodies the 1930 documentary Africa Speaks!

Plot synopsis 
The narrator introduces the audience to Africa. The journey begins in the heart of Darkest Africa. Porky Pig is leading a group of African people as they sing, carrying items. Then, during their song, they sing "We don't know where we're going, but we're going!". Meanwhile, a sign says, "Welcome to Africa Lions Club". Then, Porky and the Africans approach a sour-pussed caricature of Spencer Tracy named Stanley, a reference to his role in Stanley and Livingstone. Stanley presumes that Porky is Dr. Livingstone, but Porky tells him his name. Stanley shrugs and lets Porky and the Africans continue marching.

The narrator tells the audience that during their journey, they saw interesting specimen of wild life. An ostrich has put his head into a hole. Underground, the ostrich is actually sleeping on a pillow, and a loud snore from the ostrich is heard.

Meanwhile, two lions are eating bones of their prey. The second lion gets a columba, and together, the two lions grab the ends of the bone. The lion says "Make a wish", and after breaking the bone, they continue eating.

High in the tree tops, a mother monkey is taking her baby for a breath of fresh air. The mother is using her tail to swing her baby is if in a carriage.

Meanwhile, emerging out of the grass comes a gorilla, and as it turns around, it reveals itself to be a caricature of Tony Galento with a beer, saying that he'll "moider da bum".

A native is seen using a blowgun to "put meat on the table". Just then, it is revealed that the native is playing a carnival-related game to win a ham. The person in charge (with Mel Blanc's voice imitating Rochester from The Jack Benny Program) gives the native a ham to put meat on the table.

Later, after nightfall, the narrator says that at night, the African jungle is filled with silence, but noises start being heard. A tired Porky pops his head out of his tent, and yells to the animals "QUIET!", and goes back to sleep. Meanwhile, Stanley is still looking for Dr. Livingstone. He looks in a mother kangaroo's pouch, only to be honked on the nose by her baby.

The next day, the Africans and Porky resume their march. A tree has a poster that is a re-election poster for "King of the Jungle" (promising "Thirty Coconuts Every Thursday"- a reference to a popular "Thirty Dollars Every Thursday" pension plan of the day).

Meanwhile, the explorers come upon a very unusual situation. A cat kicks an elephant out of her house, and until he can pay his rent, she'll be keeping his trunk. Then the elephant, now without his trunk, starts crying and says that his trunk has all his stuff in it.

A vulture is looking for food. He sees three baby deer who wandered away from their mother. The vulture starts charging at them, and the deer run into a clump of grass. Just then, the grass lowers, as the deer use "Air Raid" on the vulture. They shoot down the vulture, and the deer laugh in a villainous manner.

Back with Porky, a little African native is running, yelling "Two arms!", and random gibberish. He points to the village, as the narrator says that the boy says that the villagers have spotted a strange white man in the village. Porky then drags Stanley over to the village, as the narrator says that his journey is finally over. Stanley presumes that the white man is Dr. Livingstone. The white man reveals himself to be "Cake-Icer", as he is a music teacher (a reference to Kay Kyser, and his "Kollege of Musical Knowledge" radio program). He asks the students if he's right, and then a monkey comes out of Stanley's hat saying "Yeah!" many times. Cake-Icer wants everyone to dance, and music starts with an elephant using his trunk like a tuba. Everybody starts dancing, including two fat Africans.

The narrator says that after a long day, they decide to return home. Then, Porky and the Africans start running, as the Africans are singing a different song this time. The narrator says his farewell to Africa, and then the actual continent (with a face) moves and waves goodbye.

Cast 
 Mel Blanc as Porky Pig, Africans, Lion, Cat, Elephant, Africa, Galento Gorilla, Deer, Carnival African, Kangaroo
 Ben Frommer as Stanley
 Lou Marcelle as the Narrator
 Kay Kyser as Cake-Icer
 Bill Days as Gorilla Singer
 The Sportsmen Quartet as the Singing Natives

Crew 
 Director: Bob Clampett
 Producer: Leon Schlesinger
 Musical Direction: Carl Stalling
 Orchestrator: Milt Franklyn (uncredited)
 Film Editor: Treg Brown (uncredited)
 Sound Effects: Treg Brown
 Animation: John Carey, Dave Hoffman, Izzy Ellis (uncredited), Norm McCabe (uncredited), Vive Risto (uncredited)

Edits 
Many clips of the short were removed on both 1968 and 1992 colorized versions on Nickelodeon and Cartoon Network due to its racial stereotyped theme as the short reduced to 5 minutes. The short begins with the continents and immediately goes straight to the animal clips (which is its main focus) starting with the ostrich. After the gorilla clip, it immediately fades black to the nighttime clip. However, the "King of the jungle" poster is left attached. Scenes later after the baby deer clip, it fades black to Stanley presuming Dr. Livingstone, and then cuts to the clip where the "Cake-Icer" pointing to his introduction, and following by animals playing instruments along with a clip of the "Cake-Icer" and immediately goes back to the continents. However, the face and the tissue does not show on the actual continent. Instead it immediately zooms out the continent as the cartoon ends.

Reception 
The cartoon was reviewed by Boxoffice on February 3, 1940, saying: "Play this one by all means. It is composed of the stuff that shakes the rafters and fairly blows the roof off when the laughter starts to whip around. Porky goes to Africa on a safari. What occurs when he does a little exploring was cooked up by the fertile brain that injected the right touches of unusual caricature and bang-up comedy to give 'em the shrieks. And there is an ending that will knock 'em right out of their seats."

Motion Picture Exhibitor agreed, on February 7: "One of the best of the Leon Schlesinger series... The belly laughs are many, and the gags good."

On February 20, Motion Picture Herald said: "This time porcine Porky is a leader of a safari into the darkest regions of the Black Continent. Particularly productive of funny bone tickling in the spoofing of the Stanley search for Dr. Livingstone. There are additional sights of the strange behavior of animals and natives. In fact, the whole fun and frivolity piece is good."

The short had its copyright renewed in 1969.

See also 
 Looney Tunes and Merrie Melodies filmography (1940-49)

References

External links 
 
 
 Africa Squeaks on the Internet Archive
Africa Squeaks (Colorized) on the Internet Archive

1940 films
1940 animated films
American black-and-white films
Films directed by Bob Clampett
Films set in Africa
Looney Tunes shorts
Warner Bros. Cartoons animated short films
1940s American animated films
Porky Pig films
Films scored by Carl Stalling
1940 short films
1940s English-language films